Scenes from the Heart is a 2018 book by Swedish opera singer Malena Ernman, her husband Svante Thunberg, and their daughters, climate activist Greta Thunberg and Beata Ernman. It consists of three main chapters, divided into several subchapters, and opens with the poem "Elegi" from the poetry collection Ty by Werner Aspenström. The book is written as an autobiography.

The reader follows Malena Ernman and her family as they tour Europe for Ernman's singing career. The book details elder daughter Greta's background and family life before she started her school strike climate campaign, as well as her diagnosis of Asperger's syndrome. It also addresses Greta's younger sister Beata's attention deficit hyperactivity disorder (ADHD), and the family's struggle to deal with their daughters' diagnoses. In the book, the girls' mother concludes that Asperger's and ADHD are "not a handicap" so much as a "superpower."

The book has been translated into German. In the original Swedish edition, only Malena Ernman and Svante Thunberg are credited as authors. Greta has been given top credit in new editions, and her photo is on the cover of the German edition. The book was translated into English by Paul Norlen and Saskia Vogel and an updated version with contributions from the girls, and the whole family credited as authors, was published under the title Our House Is on Fire: Scenes of a Family and a Planet in Crisis by Penguin Books on 5March 2020.

Contents 
Chapter 1: Behind the Curtain
Chapter 2: Burned-out Humans on a Burned-out Planet
Chapter 3: Imagine if Life is Real and Everything We Do Means Something

See also 
 No One is Too Small to Make a Difference, a collection of Greta Thunberg's speeches.

References

Further reading 

Witzek, Elena (May 3, 2019). Das Buch der Thunbergs : Die Welt schien auf sie gewartet zu haben, Frankfurter Allgemeine
Hecking, Claus (April 30, 2019). Greta-Thunberg-Buch Das Leben einer Familie gerät außer Kontrolle, Spiegel Online
 

2018 non-fiction books
Climate change books
Swedish autobiographies
Swedish non-fiction books
Works by Greta Thunberg
Works by Malena Ernman
Books about autistic women
Collaborative non-fiction books